John Douglas (Doug) Crawford is a Canadian neuroscientist and the scientific director of the Vision: Science to Applications(VISTA) program. He is a professor at York University where he holds the Canada Research Chair in Visuomotor Neuroscience and the title of Distinguished Research Professor in Neuroscience.

Biography 

Crawford grew up in London Ontario, where he attended the University of Western Ontario. He completed his BSc in Physiology & Psychology in 1987, studying electrophysiology with Stanley Caveney and Gordon Mogenson. He then studied three-dimensional eye movements with Tutis Vilis at Western, where he held a Medical Research Council (MRC) Studentship (1989-1992) and earned his PhD in Physiology in 1993. Following that, he spent two years (1993-1994) studying head-unrestrained gaze control as an MRC post-doctoral fellow with Daniel Guitton at the Montreal Neurological Institute. in 1995 he joined York University's Department of Psychology and York Centre for Vision Research in Toronto as an assistant professor, later attaining cross appointments to the department of Biology, School of Kinesiology & Health Sciences, and the Neuroscience Graduate Diploma Program. During this period he held a MRC Faculty Scholarship (1996-2001), Tier II Canada Research Chair (2001-2007) and Tier I Canada Research Chair (2007-2021).  He became an Associate Professor in 1999, Full Professor in 2005, and Distinguished Research Professor in 2013.

Leadership
Crawford was the founding National Coordinator of the Canadian Action and Perception Network (CAPnet), the founding Canadian director of the Brain in Action International Research Training Program, and the founding coordinator of the York Neuroscience Graduate Diploma Program. He founded York's neurophysiology laboratories, was a founding member of Melvyn A. Goodale's CIHR Group for Action and Perception  and founding co-principal investigator for the CIHR Strategic Training Program in Vision Health Research. He Founded the VSS Canadian Vision Social and is a member of the Canadian Brain Research Strategy Neuroscience Leaders Group. He is currently the scientific director of Vision: Science to Applications(VISTA), a Canada First Research Excellence Fund supported research program that integrates York University's biological and computational vision research.

Training 

Crawford has supervised over 60 graduate students and post-doctorals, many graduating to successful careers in academia, medicine, and industry. Among his noteworthy former trainees are Pieter Medendorp, Director of the Donders Centre for Cognition in Nijmegen, Julio Martinez-Trujillo, Provincial Endowed Academic Chair in Autism at Western University, Gunnar Blohm, Queens Professor and Founding Co-Director of the International Summer School in Computational Sensory-Motor Neuroscience and Neuromatch Academy, Aarlenne Khan, Canada Research Chair in Vision and Action at Université de Montréal, and Denise Henriques, York Professor and Director of the NSERC CREATE Brain in Action Program. For these activities Crawford received York University's 2003 Faculty of Graduate Studies Teaching Award and 2019 Post-Doctoral Supervisor of the Year Award.

Research 

Crawford's research investigates the neural mechanisms of visuospatial memory and sensorimotor transformations for eye, head, and hand motion. Recurrent themes in his work include 1) the idea that early representations of movement goals are stored in visual coordinates, updated during self-motion, and then transformed into three-dimensional (3D) commands for different body parts, 2) the use of theory-driven, multimodal neuroscience techniques, and 3) the use of 3D measurements and analysis of eye and body orientation. Some noteworthy findings and discoveries by Crawford and co-workers include:
 the first recordings of 3D Vestibulo–ocular reflex axes and Listing's law during head rotation
 discovery of the midbrain neural integrators for holding vertical and torsional eye orientation and head orientation.
 the use of psychophysics and fMRI to show that human parietal lobe retains and updates saccade and reach goals in gaze-centered coordinates,
 the use of stimulation-evoked eye-head movements to show that the superior colliculus encodes gaze goals in retinal coordinates, whereas frontal cortex employs multiple coordinate frames
 the use of visual psychophysics and eye tracking to show that ocular dominance reverses for left and right visual stimuli, how Listing's law of two eyes interacts with stereopsis and that optimal integration theory can explain perisaccadic change blindness
 the use of fMRI and TMS to map saccade vs. reach function in human posterior parietal cortex
 the use of TMS  and neuroimaging  to show that frontal and parietal cortex are both involved in Transsaccadic memory of visual features.
 the discovery that remembered visual stimuli are continuously updated across the superior colliculus during smooth pursuit eye movements,
 the use of MEG and neurophysiological recordings to track visuomotor transformations within neural populations in real time.
 the use of computational modeling & psychophysics, neuroimaging, and neurophysiology to determine how allocentric and egocentric representations are stored and integrated for goal-directed action.
Crawford and colleagues have also applied this research to understand the mechanisms behind visual and neurological disorders such as amblyopia, cervical dystonia and optic ataxia.

Research Awards 

Crawford has been listed amongst the world's top 2% researchers. In addition to the research fellowships, research chairs and teaching awards cited above, Crawford has received various research awards. He was awarded the Governor General's Academic Gold medal for his PhD work with Tutis Vilis. Since then, he has won various research prizes, including the 1995 Polanyi Prize in Physiology/Medicine, an Alfred P Sloan Fellowship, the 2000 Ontario Premier's Research Excellence Award, the 2002 CIFAR Young Explorer Award (awarded to the "top 20 young investigators in Canada"), the 2004 Steacie Prize (awarded to "a scientist or engineer of 40 years of age or less for outstanding scientific research carried out in Canada."), the 2016 Canadian Physiological Society Sarrazin Award., and the 2018 York President's Research Excellence Award.

References 

Scientists from Ontario
Academic staff of York University
Canadian neuroscientists
Living people
University of Western Ontario alumni
20th-century Canadian scientists
21st-century Canadian scientists
Year of birth missing (living people)